The 1975 FIA European Formula 3 Cup was the first edition of the FIA European Formula 3 Championship. The championship consisted of six rounds across the continent. The season was won by Australian Larry Perkins, with Conny Andersson second and Renzo Zorzi in third.

Calendar

Results

Championship standings

Drivers' championship

References

External links 

1975 in motorsport
FIA European Formula 3 Championship